La'Vere Lawrence Corbin-Ong (born 22 April 1991) is a Malaysian professional footballer who plays as a left-back for Malaysia Super League side Johor Darul Ta'zim and the Malaysia national team.

Early life
He was born in London, England, where his parents, Lawrence Corbin (Barbadian) and Elizabeth Ong (Malaysian Chinese), were studying psychiatry and nursing respectively. Corbin-Ong was one year old when his family moved to Edmonton, the capital city of Alberta. When he was four years of age, his family moved to North Vancouver, where he was raised.

He played a variety of sports in his youth, including football, lacrosse, gridiron football and tennis. Corbin-Ong was six years old when he started playing football for the Lynn Valley SA.

He played for Capilano University in Canada for a season after high school, then joined the Vancouver Whitecaps Residency program. In 2012, he was set to attend the University of British Columbia and join their UBC Thunderbirds soccer team, but while waiting for the new season in five months went to Europe, where he got a tryout with German fifth tier side FC Pommern Greifswald.

Club career

Whitecaps Reserves 
Corbin-Ong spent two years playing for the Whitecaps Reserves team, making 29 appearances for the club in 2010 and 2011, when the team competed in USL Premier Development League.

Germany 
Corbin-Ong spent two seasons with FC Pommern Greifswald in the Oberliga Nord, and another two seasons with Berliner AK 07 in the Regionalliga.

After receiving interest from 2. Bundesliga club 1. FC Union Berlin in 2015, Corbin-Ong signed with FSV Frankfurt in the 3. Liga in June 2016.

Go Ahead Eagles 
Corbin-Ong joined Eerste Divisie side Go Ahead Eagles on 3 July 2017. He was plagued by injuries during his time with the Eagles.

Johor Darul Ta'zim 
On 24 November 2017, Corbin-Ong was signed by Malaysian Super League club Johor Darul Ta'zim. Due to Corbin-Ong's mother being from Malaysia, he was classified as a local player.

International career 
Corbin-Ong was born in London to a Barbadian father and a Malaysian Chinese mother, but moved to Canada at the age of one and is therefore eligible to play for Canada, England, Barbados and Malaysia internationally.

In March 2017, Corbin-Ong received his first call-up to the Canadian national team. He made his international debut when he came on a second-half substitute in a 1–1 friendly draw with Scotland.

In June 2019, Corbin-Ong made his Malaysia debut after starting in the friendly match against Nepal. He was allowed to switch allegiance to Malaysia as his previous appearance for Canada was in a friendly match. He scored his first international goal for Malaysia in the FIFA World Cup Qualifier against Timor-Leste which Malaysia won 7–1.

Career statistics

International appearances

International goals
''As of match played 26 September 2022. Malaysia score listed first, score column indicates score after each Corbin-Ong goal.

Honours
Johor Darul Ta'zim
Malaysia FA Cup: 2022
Malaysia Cup: 2019, 2022
Malaysia Super League: 2018, 2019, 2020, 2021, 2022
Malaysia Charity Shield: 2018, 2019, 2020, 2021, 2022

References

External links 
 
 
 
 

1991 births
Living people
Footballers from Greater London
Citizens of Malaysia through descent
Malaysian footballers
Malaysia international footballers
Canadian soccer players
Canada men's international soccer players
English footballers
English emigrants to Canada
Naturalized citizens of Canada
Malaysian people of Barbadian descent
Canadian people of Malaysian descent
Canadian people of Barbadian descent
English people of Malaysian descent
English people of Barbadian descent
Black British sportspeople
Black Canadian soccer players
Dual internationalists (football)
Association football fullbacks
Vancouver Whitecaps FC U-23 players
Berliner AK 07 players
FSV Frankfurt players
Go Ahead Eagles players
Johor Darul Ta'zim F.C. players
Regionalliga players
3. Liga players
Eerste Divisie players
English expatriate footballers
Canadian expatriate soccer players
Malaysian expatriate footballers
English expatriate sportspeople in Germany
Canadian expatriate sportspeople in Germany
Malaysian expatriate sportspeople in Germany
Expatriate footballers in Germany
English expatriate sportspeople in the Netherlands
Canadian expatriate sportspeople in the Netherlands
Malaysian expatriate sportspeople in the Netherlands
Expatriate footballers in the Netherlands
Malaysian sportspeople of Chinese descent